The following is a comprehensive list of American pop recording artist Kelly Clarkson's concert tours. Clarkson has embarked on eight headlining concerts tours, and five co-headlining concerts tours since 2002. Her first tour was the American Idols Live! Tour 2002 following the first season of American Idol. The Meaning of Life Tour was her eighth and most recent headlining tour (fourteenth overall). Apart from her headlining tours, Clarkson has also been on two promotional tours.

American Idols Live! Tour (2002)

Independent Tour (2004)

The Independent Tour was a co-headlining tour by Clarkson and American recording artist Clay Aiken. The tour supported their debut studio albums: Thankful (2003) and Measure of a Man (2003). The tour only reached the United States during the winter and spring of 2004. Clarkson and Aiken performed individual shows before joining in a duet for Clarkson's encore. Many critics described the tour as the PG version of the Justified/Stripped Tour in 2003. The tour placed 58th in Pollstar's annual "Top 100 Tours", earning over ten million dollars with 31 shows.

Breakaway Tour (2005–06)

The Breakaway Tour was Clarkson's first headlining concert tour. The tour promoted her second studio album, Breakaway (2004). This marks Clarkson's first tour visiting Canada, Australia and Europe.

Hazel Eyes Tour (2005)

The Hazel Eyes Tour was the second headlining concert tour by Clarkson. It traveled the United States and Canada. The tour was her second to support her second studio album Breakaway (2004), following the North American leg of the Breakaway World Tour (2005) and prior to the world leg of Breakaway World Tour (2005–06) and the Addicted Tour (2006). The July 17 concert at the UCF Arena in Orlando, Florida was streamed live on AOL and AOL Radio.

Breakaway World Tour (2005–06)

Addicted Tour (2006)

The Addicted Tour was the third headlining concert tour by Clarkson. It traveled the United States beginning on June 30, 2006, in West Palm Beach, Florida and ending on August 6, 2006, in Auburn, Washington. The tour was her third to support her sophomore studio album Breakaway (2004), following the Breakaway Tour (2005–06) and Hazel Eyes Tour (2005), respectively. The tour's set list includes songs that would later appear on Clarkson's third studio album My December (2007).

My December Tour (2007–08)

The My December Tour was Clarkson's fourth headlining concert tour and followed the release her third studio album, My December (2007). Originally a large-scale summer tour timed to coincide with the June 2007 availability of the album, public career battles and poor ticket sales in North America led Clarkson to cancel it before it began. A considerably smaller-scale tour commenced in September 2007 and ran to April 2008, with the international legs in Europe and Australia remaining at arena venues.

2 Worlds 2 Voices Tour (2008)

The 2 Worlds 2 Voices Tour was a co-headlining concert tour by Clarkson and American country music artist Reba McEntire that took place in two segments during 2008. The tour only visited North America. The tour's shows featured the two singers sharing the same band and stage and performing each other's songs.

All I Ever Wanted Tour (2009–10)

The All I Ever Wanted Tour was Clarkson's fifth headlining concert tour. Visiting North America, Europe, Oceania, Africa, and Asia, the tour promoted her fourth studio album, All I Ever Wanted (2009). The tour was announced in July 2009, in the middle of Clarkson's summer fair tour. The tour faced controversy in 2010 when Clarkson's image was used to promote Indonesian cigarette brand, L.A. Lights. The ad promoted the local government to protest and ban the singer's concert in Jakarta. After legal deliberation, the company removed Clarkson's likeness in the ads and stepped down as the concert's sponsor. The concert continued as planned. This was the first time Clarkson toured Africa, New Zealand, and Asia.

Stronger Tour (2012)

The Stronger Tour was the sixth headlining tour by Clarkson. Beginning in January 2012, the tour supported her fifth studio album, Stronger (2011). With over fifty dates, the tour traveled to the Americas, Europe and Australia

Summer Tour (2012)

This was a co-headlining concert tour by Clarkson and American alternative rock band The Fray. It supported Clarkson's fifth studio album, Stronger (2011), and The Fray's third studio album, Scars & Stories (2012). Beginning in July 2012, the tour predominately visited the United States and Canada for thirty shows. Most of the shows on the tour were held in outdoor amphitheatres.

Tour dates

12th Annual Honda Civic Tour (2013)

This was the 12th edition of the Honda Civic Tour headline by American pop-rock group Maroon 5 with Clarkson as the special guest. It supported Maroon 5's album Overexposed (2012) and Clarkson's greatest hits album (2012). The tour lasted from August 1 to October 6, 2013, with thirty-four dates across the United States and Canada.

Piece by Piece Tour (2015)

The Piece by Piece Tour was Clarkson's seventh headlining concert tour. It supported her seventh studio album, Piece by Piece (2015). The tour began on July 11, 2015, and finished on September 10 in Atlanta.

Meaning of Life Tour (2019)

The Meaning of Life Tour was Clarkson's eight headlining concert tour. It supported her eight studio album, Meaning of Life (2017). The tour began on January 24, 2019, in Oakland, California and finished on March 30, 2019, in Greenville, South Carolina. 
It was Clarkson's highest grossing tour to date grossing $17.5 million, and sold over 275,000 tickets.

See also
 List of Kelly Clarkson promotional tours

References

Concert tours
Clarkson, Kelly